Ensaculin (KA-672) is a drug from the coumarin family, which has been researched as a potential treatment for dementia. It acts on a number of receptor systems, being both a weak NMDA antagonist and a 5HT1A agonist. Animal studies have shown promising nootropic effects, although efficacy in humans has yet to be proven. It was well tolerated in human trials, with the main side effect being orthostatic hypotension (low blood pressure).

See also
 Enciprazine
 Mafoprazine
 BMY-14802
 Azaperone
 Fluanisone

References 

Nootropics
N-(2-methoxyphenyl)piperazines
Coumarin drugs
Catechol ethers
Resorcinol ethers